Tulay Hatımoğulları Oruç (born 1977) is a Turkish economist and politician. She is the Co-Chair of the Socialist Refoundation Party (SYKP) and a member of the Grand National Assembly of Turkey.

Early life and education 
Tulay Hatımoğulları Oruç was born in Samandag, Hatay province in 1977 and studied economics at the Anadolu University.

Political career 
Her adherence to political socialism defined itself during high school. Tulay Hatımoğulları Oruç was elected Co-Chair of the SYKP in 2016. In the parliamentary elections of June 2018 she was elected to the Grand National Assembly of Turkey representing the Hatay Province for the Peoples' Democratic Party (HDP). On the 17 March 2021, the Turkish state prosecutor before the Court of Cassation, Bekir Şahin filed a lawsuit at the Constitutional Court demanding for her and 686 other politicians a five-year ban for political activities.

Political views 
As the Co-Chair of the Religion and Faith Commission of the HDP, she defends the protection of the cultural rights of the minorities in Turkey according to the Treaty of Lausanne from 1923. She opposed the deployment of Turkish troops to Libya. She is also on the view that Kurdistan exists, which in November 2021 prompted a trilateral discussion between her, fellow HDP Politician Garo Paylan, and the Turkish Defense Minister Hulusi Akar who denied the existence of a Kurdistan, be it in Turkey or Iraq. When in May 2022 several performances of Kurdish artists were banned, she demanded an information whether there existed an order from the Turkish Government banning such performances.

Personal life 
She was raised in an Arab household and identifies as a feminist and an Alevi.

References 

1977 births
Living people
People from Samandağ
Turkish feminists
Peoples' Democratic Party (Turkey) politicians
21st-century Turkish women politicians
21st-century Turkish politicians